Charles Carolus Andriamatsinoro (born 6 July 1989), simply known as Andria, is a Malagasy professional footballer who plays as a forward for Saudi club Najran and the Madagascar national team.

Club career

WA Tlemcen
On 31 January 2011, Carolus signed for Algerian club WA Tlemcen. On 19 March 2011, he made his debut for the club in a 1–1 away draw USM Annaba, scoring his first goal for the club in the 90th minute of the game. On 18 February 2012, he scored his first hat-trick for the club in a 4–2 home win against MC Oran, his first, a shot from the edge of the penalty box in the 10th minute, his second, heading in from close range in the 78th minute, and his third, receiving the ball in the opposition half, dribbling past three defenders and finishing past the keeper in the 90th minute. He finished with 10 goals in 22 appearances in the second season at the club.

USM Alger
On 28 May 2012, Carolus signed for Algerian club USM Alger. On 16 April 2014, he made his league debut in a 1–0 away defeat to ASO Chlef, coming in at the 55th minute after being subbed on for Mohamed Seguer. In his first season at the club, he missed 9 months due to a serious injury to the knee, and until the end of the season, was only able to play in 6 matches, including the final of the 2013 Algerian Cup and the 2013 UAFA Club Cup, winning both of them in his debut season. On 24 August 2013, in his second season, he scored his first goal for the club in a 4–1 home win against MO Béjaïa. After being subbed in at the 66th minute mark for Lamouri Djediat, in the 68th minute, he received a pass from Hamza Koudri and finished low in the left corner to make it 2–0 in favour of USMA, four minutes later, he scored his second for the club after beating keeper Mourad Berrefane in a one-on-one situation. On 11 January 2014, he scored in a 2–0 win against ES Sétif in the 2013 Algerian Super Cup, scoring in the 40th minute, after Farès Benabderahmane had made a defensive mistake, seconds earlier. He eventually won the 2013–14 Ligue 1 title and also finished as USMA's top scorer of the season with six goals, along with Ahmed Gasmi and Abdelmalek Ziaya.

In the 2014–15 season, Carolus signed a new deal which would keep him at the club for two more seasons. On 15 February 2015, he made his CAF Champions League debut in a 3–0 home win against Foullah Edifice in the 2015 CAF Champions League preliminary round, also scoring his debut goal in the competition in the same game. He scored his second goal in the competition in a 1–1 away draw against Guinean club AS Kaloum and helped USMA qualify for the 2015 CAF Champions League group stage. On 10 July 2015, he made his CAF Champions League group stage debut in a 1–0 home win against Sudanese side Al-Merrikh. USMA eventually reached the final of the competition for the first time in the history, where they faced Congolese side TP Mazembe. Carolus missed the first leg due to suspension, but was part of the squad in the second leg, as USMA lost 4–1 on aggregate to finish runners-up.

Next season, he scored four league goals and won his second Ligue 1 title. On 12 May 2017, he scored his first CAF Champions League group stage goal in a 3–0 home win against Libyan side Al-Ahli Tripoli. He scored his last goal for the club in a 2–1 home win against MC Oran. Carlous left the club in 2017, after his contract was expired. He finished his USMA career with 20 goals in 132 games and won 6 titles in the process.

Ohod Club
On 12 August 2017, Carolus made his Ohod debut in a 2–1 away win against Al-Shabab. On 7 September 2017, Carolus scored his first goal for the club in a 1–1 penalty loss to Al-Fateh in the 2017–18 Saudi Crown Prince Cup round of 16. On 19 October 2017, he scored his first league goal for the club in a 2–2 home draw against Al-Nassr. Carolus scored 1 goal in 10 league appearances and joined Al-Adalah in June 2018.

On 5 August 2021, Carolus returned to Ohod on a one-year contract.

Kuwait
On 7 July 2022, Carolus joined Kuwaiti club Kuwait SC. On 22 August 2022, Carolus was released from his contract.

Najran
On 31 August 2022, Carolus joined Najran.

International career
In March 2011, Carolus was part of the Madagascar U23s who participated in the 2011 CAF U-23 Championship qualification. Madagascar lost 4–0 on aggregate to Algeria in the first qualifying round and were not able to qualify for the finals.

On 12 July 2009, Carolus made his national team debut in a 2–2 friendly draw against Mayotte. On 19 July 2009, he played his first match against a FIFA nation in a 1–0 friendly loss against South Africa. On 18 May 2014, he scored his first ever senior international goal in a 2–1 win against Uganda in the 2015 Africa Cup of Nations first qualifying round.

On 12 June 2019, he was named in Madagascar's 23-man squad for the 2019 Africa Cup of Nations in Egypt. On 22 June 2019, at the 55th minute mark, in the opening match against Guinea, Carolus ran on to a long ball and shot past Aly Keita to score Madagascar's second ever goal in the Africa Cup of Nations. The match subsequently ended in a 2–2 draw. On 30 June 2019, he scored in a 2–0 win against Nigeria, shooting in the 53rd minute from a free kick, the ball took a huge deflection off Wilfred Ndidi and ended in the top right corner of the goal. Madagascar thus qualified for the round of 16, after they topped the group ahead of Nigeria.

Personal life
In 2013, Carolus converted to Islam, and married to an Algerian, with whom he has one son. He also holds an Algerian nationality.

Career statistics

Club

International

International goals

Scores and results list Madagascar's goal tally first.

Honours
Academie Ny Antsika
THB Champions League   : 2008 

USM Alger
Algerian Ligue Professionnelle 1  : 2013-14, 2015-16
Algerian Cup : 2013
Algerian Super Cup : 2013, 2016
UAFA Club Cup : 2013
 CAF Champions League : Runners-up 2015

Individual
Best Player of the THB Champions League  : 2009
Top scorer THB Champions League  : 2008, 2009, 2010 
Nominees shortlist for African Player of the Year based in Africa : 2015 
Man of the Match Nigeria group B  : Africa Cup Of Nation 2019 
Group Stage best squad  : Africa Cup Of Nation 2019 
Trophy OFC  : revelation of Africa Cup Of Nation 2019 
Knight Order of Madagascar: 2019
Best Player of the MS League  : 2019
Saudi First Division Golden Boot : 2018–19, 2021–22
Top scorer 2019–20 King Cup  : 2020
Nominees shortlist for African Player of the year : 2019

Record

First malagasy player nominated for the African Player of the Year based in Africa trophy

References

External links
DZFoot Profile

1989 births
Living people
Malagasy footballers
Madagascar international footballers
WA Tlemcen players
Expatriate footballers in Algeria
Algerian Ligue Professionnelle 1 players
Malagasy expatriate sportspeople in Algeria
Paradou AC players
USM Alger players
People from Boeny
Association football forwards
Academie Ny Antsika players
Expatriate footballers in Saudi Arabia
Expatriate footballers in Kuwait
Saudi Professional League players
Ohod Club players
Al-Adalah FC players
Al-Qadsiah FC players
Kuwait SC players
Najran SC players
Saudi First Division League players
Kuwait Premier League players
Naturalized citizens of Algeria
Malagasy Muslims
Converts to Islam
Malagasy expatriate footballers
2019 Africa Cup of Nations players
Recipients of orders, decorations, and medals of Madagascar